Splat may refer to:

 Splat (furniture), an element of the chair
 Asterisk (slang)
Splatbook in role-playing game, derived from *book
 Splatting, volume rendering technique
 Nickelodeon Splat!, a television block
 NickSplat, a later television block also from Nickelodeon
 Splat Pack, a collection of filmmakers
 Texture splat, a computer graphics effect
 Splatt, Cornwall, a small village in Cornwall
 SPLAT-COSMETICA - Russian manufacturer of oral care products
 "Splat!" (The Brak Show), a 2003 episode
 Splat the Cat, a 2008 children's picture book by Rob Scotton

Software
 SPLAT!, a terrestrial radio propagation model application

Games
 Splat! (video game)

See also
 Splatt (disambiguation)